(They will all come forth out of Sheba), 65, is a church cantata by Johann Sebastian Bach. He composed it in 1724 in Leipzig for Epiphany and first performed it on 6 January 1724 as part of his first cantata cycle.

Bach wrote the cantata to conclude his first Christmas season as Thomaskantor in Leipzig which had been celebrated with five cantatas, four of them new compositions, the Magnificat and a new Sanctus. The text by an anonymous author, who possibly supplied texts of two of the Christmas cantatas as well, combines the prescribed readings for the feast day, the prophecy from the Book of Isaiah and the gospel of Matthew about the Wise Men from the East. The librettist begins with a quotation from the prophecy, comments it by a stanza of the early anonymous Christmas carol "", says in a sequence of recitatives and arias that the prophecy was fulfilled in Bethlehem, concluding that the Christian should bring his heart as a gift. The cantata ends with a chorale, stanza 10 of Paul Gerhardt's hymn "".

Bach festively scored the seven-movement cantata, for two vocal soloists (tenor  and bass), a four-part choir and a Baroque instrumental ensemble of two horns, two recorders, two oboes da caccia, strings and basso continuo. All recitatives are secco, but the full orchestra plays for the opening chorus, the last aria and the closing chorale.

History and words 
Bach wrote the cantata in 1724, in his first year as Thomaskantor (director of church music) in Leipzig, to conclude his first Christmas season on the Feast of Epiphany. For the celebrations on three days of Christmas, New Year's Day and the following Sunday, he had performed five cantatas, four of them new compositions, the Magnificat and a new Sanctus in D major:
 
 Sanctus in D major, BWV 238
 Magnificat in E-flat major, BWV 243a
 
 
 
 .

The prescribed readings for the feast day were taken from the Book of Isaiah, the heathen will convert, and from the Gospel of Matthew, the Wise Men from the East bringing gifts of gold, myrrh and frankincense to the newborn Jesus. The unknown poet of the cantata text may be the same as for BWV 40 and BWV 64 for the Second and Third Day of Christmas, a person "theologically competent and poetically skilfull (sic)", as the Bach scholar Klaus Hofmann writes. The librettist begins with the final verse of the epistle reading, Isaiah's prophecy "all they from Sheba shall come: they shall bring gold and incense". The poet juxtaposes the prediction by a chorale, stanza 4 of the old anonymous Christmas carol "" ("", "A babe is born in Bethlehem", 1543), which describes the arrival of the "" (Kings from Sheba), related to the epistle. The first recitative proclaims that the gospel is the fulfillment of the prophecy and concludes that it is the Christian's duty to bring his heart as a gift to Jesus. This idea is the theme of the following aria. The second recitative equates the gifts of the contemporary Christian to those of the kings: Faith to the gold, Prayer to the incense, and Patience to the myrrh. The last aria expresses that the devoted Christian offers his heart as a present. The cantata ends with a chorale. The text is not extant, but it is assumed to be stanza 10 of Paul Gerhardt's hymn "".

Bach first performed the cantata for Epiphany on 6 January 1724. In his Christmas Oratorio of 1734, Bach dedicated Part VI, to the topic and the occasion and first performed it on 6 January 1735.

Music

Structure and scoring 
Bach structured the cantata in seven movements. The opening chorus is followed by a chorale, then the two soloists sing a sequence of recitative and aria each, and work closes with a chorale. Bach scored the cantata for two vocal soloists (tenor (T) and bass (B)), a four-part choir and a festive Baroque instrumental ensemble of two horns (Co), two recorders (Fl), two oboes da caccia (Oc), two violins (Vl), viola (Va), and basso continuo. Bach employed a pair of horns before in his Christmas cantata , BWV 40, and later in his cantata for Christmas 1724, and later in Part IV of his Christmas Oratorio. He wrote the title as "J. J. Festo Epiphan: Concerto. à 2 Core du Chasse. 2 Hautb: da Caccia. / due Fiauti 2 Violini è Viola con 4 Voci", which means: "Jesus help (Jesu Juva - a pre-fixed prayer to most of Bach's compositions). Feast of the Epiphany: concerto for 2 hunting horns. 2 oboes da caccia / two recorders 2 violins and viola with 4 voices."

The following table of movements gives the scoring according to the Neue Bach-Ausgabe. The keys and time signatures are taken from the book on all the Bach cantatas by the Bach scholar Alfred Dürr, using the symbol for common time (4/4). The continuo, playing throughout, is not shown.

Movements 
Bach uses scoring and especially instrumentation to illustrate the contrast between poverty and abundance. While all recitatives are secco, and the strings are silent for the first aria which is supported only by the oboes da caccia in low register, a festive orchestra with three kinds of wind instruments and strings accompanies not only, as usual, the opening chorus and the closing chorale, but also the penultimate movement, a tenor aria expressing how the believer gives his heart as a present. Hofmann notes that Bach "combines high art with the folk style".

1 
The opening chorus, "" (They will all come forth out of Sheba), depicts, that "" (all), not just the wise men, gather and move to adore. Horn signals call first and prevail throughout the movement. Canonical and imitative developments depict the growing of a crowd. The central section is an extended choral fugue, framed by two sections with the voices embedded in a repeat of the instrumental introduction. John Eliot Gardiner remarked in connection with his Bach Cantata Pilgrimage that the instrumentation resembles Near Eastern music, the recorders representing "the high pitches often associated with oriental music and the oboes da caccia (in tenor register) to evoke the shawm-like double-reed instruments (salamiya and zurna) of the Near East".

2 

The same idea is rendered in a stanza from the Christmas carol, "" (The kings came out of Sheba), telling of the (unknown number of) Kings from Sheba as mentioned by Isaiah. Its melody, in triple time, is set for four parts.

3 
The first recitative, "" (What Isaiah prophesied there has happened in Bethlehem.), applies the situation to the individual Christian, who has nothing to offer as a gift but his heart, explained in an arioso ending. The musicologist Julian Mincham notes unexpected harmonies when the stable of Bethlehem is mentioned, as if to illustrate the "lowliness of that birthplace".

4 
The first aria, "" (Gold from Ophir is too meager), is accompanied by the oboes da caccia, whose low register together with the bass voice conveys the humility expressed in the words. The instruments keep repeating the first motif, recalling the initial idea that gold is not good enough.

5 
The tenor recitative, "" (Do not scorn, o You the light of my soul, my heart), begins with a plea, expressed in a line descending through a ninth. It ends on the notion "" (the abundance of the greatest wealth must some day be mine in Heaven).

6 
To show the abundance, the dance-like aria, "" (Take me to Yourself as Your own), is accompanied by all the wind instruments, playing concertante and together. Instead of a conventional da capo aria, Bach creates a bar form by repeating the text of the second idea on new musical material. A long ritornello of 32 measures "contains an almost unprecedented variety of instrumental colouring", as Mincham writes.

7 
The closing chorale, "" (Ah! now, then, my God, I fall confidently into Your hands.), is sung on the melody of "", which Bach used frequently later, as the base for his chorale cantata BWV 111 and movement 25 of his St Matthew Passion.

Recordings 
The entries are taken from the selection on the Bach Cantatas Website. Choirs  with one voice per part (OVPP) and instrumental groups playing period instruments in historically informed performances are highlighted green.

References

Sources 
 
 Sie werden aus Saba alle kommen BWV 65; BC A 27 / Sacred cantata (The Epiphany) Bach Digital
 BWV 65 Sie werden aus Saba alle kommen: English translation, University of Vermont
 BWV 65 Sie werden aus Saba alle kommen: text, scoring, University of Alberta
 Luke Dahn: BWV 65.2, BWV 65.7 bach-chorales.com

External links 
 Sie werden aus Saba alle kommen, BWV 65: performance by the Netherlands Bach Society (video and background information)

Church cantatas by Johann Sebastian Bach
1724 compositions
Epiphany music